The George Washington University (GW or GWU) is a private federally chartered research university in Washington, D.C. Chartered in 1821 by the United States Congress, GWU is the largest institution of higher education in Washington, D.C.

George Washington, the first president of the United States, advocated for the establishment of a national university in the U.S. capital in his first State of the Union address in 1790 and continued to promote this idea throughout his career and until his death in 1799. In his will, Washington left shares in the Potomac Company to endow the university. However, due to the company's financial difficulties, funds were raised independently by Baptist ministers. Among the founding patrons of the university were John Quincy Adams, John C. Calhoun, and James Monroe On February 9, 1821, the university was established by an Act of Congress first as Columbian College and then as Columbian University, making it one of only five universities in the United States with a congressional charter.

The university's undergraduate and graduate schools include the Columbian College of Arts and Sciences, the Elliott School of International Affairs, the GWU School of Business, the School of Media and Public Affairs, the Trachtenberg School of Public Policy and Public Administration, the GWU Law School, and the Corcoran School of the Arts and Design. GWU's main campus is located in the Foggy Bottom area of Washington, D.C. The International Monetary Fund and World Bank are located on the campus, and the White House and the U.S. Department of State are located within blocks of it. GWU hosts numerous research centers and institutes, including the National Security Archive and the Institute for International Economic Policy. GWU has two satellite campuses: the Mount Vernon campus, located in Washington, D.C.'s Foxhall neighborhood, and the Virginia Science and Technology Campus in Loudoun County, Virginia.

GWU is classified among "R1: Doctoral Universities – Very High Research Activity." The university offers degree programs in seventy-one disciplines, enrolling around 11,000 undergraduate and 15,500 graduate students. GWU is home to extensive student life programs, a strong Greek culture, and over 450 other student organizations. The school's athletic teams, the George Washington Colonials, play in the NCAA Division I Atlantic 10 Conference. GWU also annually hosts numerous political events, including the World Bank and International Monetary Fund's Annual Meetings.

The university's alumni, faculty, and affiliates include 16 foreign heads of state or government, 28 United States senators, 27 United States governors, 18 U.S. Cabinet members, five Nobel laureates, two Olympic medalists, two Academy Award winners, and a Golden Globe winner. GWU has over 1,100 active alumni in the U.S. Foreign Service and is one of the largest feeder schools for the diplomatic corps.

History

Founding
The first President of the United States, George Washington, long favored the establishment of a university in a central part of the United States. He wrote to the U.S. Congress and others in favor of it, and envisioned it would be in a central part of D.C., stating he hoped the university would educate the most promising students from across the country while reaping the benefits of the nation's capital. He wished for the students to become "citizen leaders" of the new republic. Washington included a bequest of his shares in the Potomac Company in his last will and testament, though the shares lost their value and no educational institution ever benefited from them. His desire was shared and encouraged after his death by Presidents Thomas Jefferson and James Madison, and they expressed the need to carry out Washington's plans. Finally, in 1821 the Baptist missionary and leading minister Luther Rice secured funds from James Monroe, John Quincy Adams, John C. Calhoun and other benefactors for a college to educate citizens from throughout the young nation in Washington, D.C. A large building was constructed on College Hill, which is now known as Meridian Hill, and on February 9, 1821, President Monroe approved the congressional charter creating the non-denominational Columbian College. Washingtonians, Congress and the academic community celebrated this new institution as the fulfillment of Washington's vision.

GWU, like much of Washington, D.C., traces many of its origins back to the Freemasons. The Bible that the President of the George Washington University uses to swear an oath on upon inauguration is the Bible of Freemason George Washington. Freemasonry symbols are prominently displayed throughout the campus including the foundation stones of many of the university buildings.

19th century 
During the Civil War, many students left to join the Confederacy and the college's buildings were used as a Union Army military hospital and barracks. Walt Whitman was among many of the volunteers to work on the campus.

Following the war, in 1873, Columbian College became the Columbian University and moved to an urban downtown location centered on 15th and H streets.

20th century

Columbian University was renamed The George Washington University in 1904 after an agreement with the George Washington Memorial Association to build a campus building in honor of the first U.S. president. Neither the university nor the association were able to raise enough funds for the proposed building near the National Mall; however, the institution retained the name and the money that was raised went to the eventual construction of Lisner Auditorium. The university moved its principal operations to the D.C. neighborhood of Foggy Bottom in 1912.Many of the Colleges of the George Washington University stand out for their age and history. The Law School is the oldest law school in the District of Columbia. The School of Medicine and Health Sciences is the 11th oldest medical school in the nation. The Columbian College was founded in 1821, and is the oldest unit of the university. The Elliott School of International Affairs was formalized in 1898.

In the 1930s, the university was a major center for theoretical physics. The cosmologist George Gamow produced critical work on the Big Bang theory at GWU in the 1930s and 1940s. In one of the most important moments in the 20th century, Niels Bohr announced that Otto Hahn had successfully split the atom on January 26, 1939, at the Fifth Washington Conference on theoretical physics in the Hall of Government.

During the Vietnam War era, Thurston Hall, an undergraduate dormitory housing 1,116 students was a staging ground for student anti-war Demonstrations. (At 1900 F Street NW, the building is 3 blocks from the White House.) 

In 1996, the university purchased the Mount Vernon College for Women in the city's Palisades neighborhood that became the school's coeducational Mount Vernon Campus. The campus was first utilized in 1997 for women only but became co-educational in a matter of years. The Mount Vernon campus is now totally integrated into the GWU community, serving as a complement to the Foggy Bottom campus. In 1999, GWU hosted the Town Hall with President Clinton, the first presidential town hall to ever be webcast live.

21st century
In December 2006, the university appointed Johns Hopkins University provost Steven Knapp as the next President of the George Washington University, and his presidency began August 1, 2007. In 2017, Thomas LeBlanc, provost of the University of Miami, was named the President of the George Washington University.

In July 2020, the university began forming special committees to look at possible name changes to an on-campus building and the school moniker. In a statement on the university's website, George Washington University President Thomas LeBlanc said one of the panels will examine the Colonials moniker, which critics say is antiquated and conjures up racism, violence and genocide. George Washington University law professor and Ward 3 D.C. Council member Mary Cheh will serve as chair of that committee. Another panel, to be chaired by George Washington University law professor Roger Fairfax Jr., looked into renaming the Marvin Center. The building was named after former school President Cloyd Heck Marvin, who was a known segregationist.

In February 2021, the university celebrated its 200th anniversary of its Congressional Charter. GW hosted former student, Senator Elizabeth Warren as speaker.

In January 2022, LeBlanc was succeeded by former Washington University in St. Louis Chancellor Mark S. Wrighton as interim university president. One year later in January 2023, the university named Ellen Granberg as the new president, with a start date of July 1, 2023.

Campuses

GWU has three fully integrated campuses in the Washington, D.C. area. These are the Foggy Bottom Campus, the Mount Vernon Campus, and the Virginia Science and Technology Campus. The Foggy Bottom Campus houses the vast majority of academic programming. Residence halls exist on the Foggy Bottom and Mount Vernon campuses.

The GWU library system contains the Gelman Library, the Himmelfarb Health Sciences Library, the Burns Law Library, Eckles Library (named for Charles Ellison Eckles and Anita Heurich Eckles), and the Virginia Science and Technology Library. The GWU Library System is a constituent member of the Washington Research Library Consortium, which allows for resource sharing among the university libraries of the Washington metropolitan area.

Foggy Bottom
      
Barring a few outlying buildings, the boundaries of campus are delineated by (running clockwise from Washington Circle) Pennsylvania Avenue, 19th Street, E Street, Virginia Avenue, 24th Street, and New Hampshire Avenue. The university owns much of the property in Foggy Bottom and leases it to various tenants, including the World Bank and the International Monetary Fund. Other institutions in proximity include the U.S. State Department, the Kennedy Center, the U.S. Institute of Peace, the Watergate complex, and embassies of Bosnia and Herzegovina, Mexico, Saudi Arabia, Spain, and Uruguay. The University Yard is the main open space and historic heart of the university. Along with George Washington's main library, Gelman Library, it constitutes the hub of the main campus. The seven-story Gelman Library building contains over two million volumes and is constructed in the Brutalist architectural style of the 1970s. It features a concrete façade punctuated by windows that are divided by projecting vertical slabs. For most of the year, parts of the library are open 24 hours a day, seven days per week for use by students, faculty, and staff. The library's seventh floor includes the Special Collections Research Center, National Security Archives, Global Resources Center, and Kiev Library.

The National Security Archives (NSA) is a research institution that publishes declassified U.S. government files concerning selected topics of American foreign policy. It was a National Security Archive Freedom of Information Act request that eventually made the Central Intelligence Agency's so-called "Family Jewels" public.

Close to the library is Lisner Auditorium and a large open area between them is known as Kogan Plaza. Southeast of the plaza and located near Monroe Hall and Hall of Government is the Monroe Court, a landscaped area with a large fountain. The Foggy Bottom–GWU Washington Metro station is located at the intersection of 23rd and I Streets NW due south of Washington Circle, and provides access to the Orange, Blue and Silver lines. The University Hospital is located next to the Metro station entrance.

The Foggy Bottom campus contains most of the residence halls in which GWU students live. The most notable include Shenkman Hall, Thurston Hall, Madison Hall, Potomac House, Fulbright Hall, Mitchell Hall, Munson Hall, Jacqueline Bouvier Kennedy Onassis Hall, Phillip Amsterdam Hall, Guthridge Hall, Madison Hall, Townhouse Row, South Hall, and the newest, District House, which opened in 2016.

In late 2007, construction began on a large mixed-use residential, office and retail development located on the site of the old GWU Hospital (Square 54) and just east of the Foggy Bottom–GWU Metrorail station. It was the second-largest undeveloped lot in the District of Columbia at the time of initial construction activity. In 2014, the university assumed ownership of the Corcoran Gallery of Art, the oldest private art museum in Washington, D.C. and independent college of art and design. The college of art and design became The Corcoran School of the Arts and Design under the Columbian College of Arts and Sciences. The National Gallery of Art will acquire many of the 17,000 pieces of art from the Corcoran and the rest will be donated to other museums around the country. In May 2014, GWU opened the Milken Institute School of Public Health, a nine-story building that received LEED certification for sustainability features including a green roof, rainwater collection system, and special heating and air conditioning technologies that helps mass air displacement. The Textile Museum reopened to the public in March 2015 after the institution merged with the university in 2011 and closed it for renovations two years later.

Mount Vernon
In 1996, the university purchased the Mount Vernon College for Women in the city's Palisades neighborhood that became the school's coeducational Mount Vernon Campus. Initially, the Mount Vernon Campus remained exclusively a women's college until 1999 when GWU changed its operations to a co-ed facility. Now known as the Mount Vernon campus, it is totally integrated into the GWU community, serving as a complement to the Foggy Bottom campus. The campus has transportation systems connecting the students to the GWU campus in Foggy Bottom. It also includes Eckles Library, six residence halls, Lloyd Gymnasium, The GW-Mount Vernon Athletic Complex and other various campus facilities.

Virginia

The George Washington University also operates a research and graduate campus in Ashburn, Virginia (near Dulles International Airport) which was established in 1991.

Additionally, the university also operates several other graduate satellite education centers. These include the Alexandria Graduate Education Center in Alexandria, the Graduate Education Center in Arlington, and the Hampton Roads Center in Newport News. The Virginia Science and Technology Campus hosts research and educational partnerships with industry and government officials and offers more than 20 graduate degrees.

The Virginia Science and Technology Campus is home to the first walkable solar-power sidewalk in the world. The project began in 2012 and was completed two years later, inaugurated in October 2014.

Organization
George Washington University is governed by the GWU Board of Trustees, the President of the George Washington University, provost, deans, and department chairs. The university employs over 6,000 faculty members, administrators, and support staff. In 2007, Steven Knapp  was named the university's sixteenth president.; he had previously taught at the University of California, Berkeley and was later the provost at Johns Hopkins University. The current President of the George Washington University is Mark S. Wrighton. Ulysses S. Grant was a member of the Board of Trustees, and his Grandson, Ulysses S. Grant III, was Vice President of GW. John Quincy Adams was also a member of the board of trustees.

Schools and colleges

GWU is organized into fourteen schools and colleges, each with a different dean and organization. The Columbian College of Arts and Sciences was the original academic unit of the university. The Medical School is the 11th oldest medical school in the nation and the first to open in the District of Columbia. The Law School was also the first law school in the District of Columbia. Each academic unit has a distinct identity within the broader university. The Graduate School of Political Management and the Corcoran School of the Arts and Design were organized outside of the university, later to join in 1987 and 2014, respectively.

Columbian College of Arts and Sciences
The Columbian College of Arts and Sciences (CCAS) is the oldest and largest college in the university. It was founded in 1821; at the beginning of the university's history, there was no distinction between this college and the university.  The School of Media and Public Affairs (SMPA), and the Trachtenberg School of Public Policy and Public Administration (SPPPA) belong to this college, although they are run separately. The Columbian College was among the first American institutions to grant a Doctor of Philosophy (Ph.D.), in 1888. The Columbian College is notable for its academic diversity, and offers a wide range of majors and courses of study. The Columbian College contains the Trachtenberg School of Public Policy and Public Administration, the School of Media and Public Affairs, and the Corcoran School of the Arts and Design. The Columbian College is primarily housed in Philips Hall, Rome Hall, Smith Hall of Art, MPA Building, Monroe Hall, Hall of Government, 1922 F Street, Corcoran Hall, Bell Hall, Samson Hall, Lisner Hall, and many other places around campus. The college is also present on the Mount Vernon and Virginia Campuses.

Trachtenberg School of Public Policy and Public Administration
The Trachtenberg School of Public Policy and Public Administration is a graduate school in the Columbian College of Arts and Sciences. Consistently ranked as one of the top Public Affairs Schools in the United States, it is ranked 11th nationwide by U.S. News & World Report. The Trachtenberg School offers Master of Public Policy, Master of Public Administration, and PhD degrees in Public Policy and Public Administration. The school works in partnership with the Elliott School of International Affairs, the School of Public Health and Health Services, and the Graduate School of Education & Human Development to offer a variety of concentrations for its graduates.

School of Media and Public Affairs
The School of Media and Public Affairs (SMPA), although run separately, belongs to the Columbian College of Arts in Sciences. It offers two undergraduate degrees, Journalism and Mass Communication and Political Communication and a master's degree in Media and Public Affairs. It is housed in the same building as the Graduate School of Political Management. The Public Affairs Project at GW, part of SMPA, is responsible for the creation and production of the PBS special, Planet Forward. School of Media and Public Affairs (SMPA) was the first in the nation to offer a bachelor's degree in Political Communication. The program boasts a faculty of retired and current professionals – including CNN correspondents, journalists, political analysts, and campaign professionals. The school is consistently ranked in the top 10 programs in the nation.

Corcoran School of the Arts and Design
The Corcoran School of the Arts and Design is one of the oldest arts education institutions in the United States. It is a school of the Columbian College of Arts and Sciences. It is housed in the Corcoran Gallery of Art, the oldest private cultural institution in Washington, D.C.

Formerly an independent institution, known as the Corcoran College of Art and Design, the institution later merged the college operations with the George Washington University. The school retained over 20 full-time faculty members, and the college will continue to function as a separate entity within the university. The school has a historic building facing the White House on 17th Street.

School of Business
The George Washington School of Business was established in 1928 with a $1 million gift by the Supreme Council of Scottish Rite Freemasonry Southern Jurisdiction. On February 6, 2006, the chairman and CEO of FedEx, Frederick W. Smith, opened a new complex for the school called Ric and Dawn Duquès Hall, which today houses the business school along with the Norma Lee and Morton Funger Hall.

, GW's undergraduate business program was ranked 42nd nationally and its International Business program was ranked ninth by U.S. News & World Report.

School of Medicine and Health Sciences
Founded in 1824, the School of Medicine and Health Sciences (SMHS), or simply the George Washington School of Medicine, was the first school of medicine in Washington, D.C.

In 1981, George Washington University Hospital became the center of the national spotlight when President Ronald Reagan was rushed to the emergency room after an attempted assassination.

GWU Hospital's emergency department was later renamed the Ronald Reagan Institute of Emergency Medicine. Other politicians, such as former Vice President Dick Cheney, come to GWU for routine and emergency procedures. Cheney and wife Lynne Cheney helped to start the Richard B. and Lynne V. Cheney Cardiovascular Institute in 2006. Others notable patients include former First Lady Laura Bush, who was treated for a pinched nerve.SMHS is primarily housed in the GWU Hospital, Ross Hall, and many other centers along K Street and throughout the city.

GWU was once home to the George Washington Dental College, but this department would close in 1921 due to budget constraints.

School of Engineering and Applied Science

The School of Engineering and Applied Science (SEAS) was founded on October 1, 1884, as the Corcoran Scientific School of Columbian University. The school separated from the Columbian College in 1962 and was one of the first to accept women for degree candidacy in engineering. The bazooka was invented at the SEAS in 1942. The school moved into the new Science and Engineering Hall in D.C. in March 2015.

Elliott School of International Affairs
The Elliott School of International Affairs (ESIA) was founded in 1898, as the School of Comparative Jurisprudence and Diplomacy. Under President Lloyd Elliott, the school separated from Columbian College. On September 3, 2003, alumnus Colin Powell opened a new complex for this school at 1957 E Street NW in front of the Department of State. , its undergraduate program was ranked eighth globally by Foreign Policy magazine, while the graduate program is currently ranked seventh in the world. ESIA is primarily housed in Elliott Hall at 1957 E St.

School of Nursing
The history of nursing education at GWU spans more than 100 years. In 2002, Jean Johnson, Ph.D., RN, FAAN, then senior associate dean for Health Sciences, met with the nursing faculty to assess GW's capacity to create GW's degree programs. The faculty moved forward to develop an MSN in the GWU School of Medicine and Health Sciences with programs in adult nurse practitioner, family nurse practitioner, nursing leadership and management, and clinical research administration. The first MSN class was admitted in 2004.

Meanwhile, approval was also obtained to develop a Department of Nursing Education. As the first and only chair of the department, Ellen Dawson, Ph.D., RN, ANP, led the MSN program to accreditation in time for the graduation of the first class in 2006. Also, she spearheaded the development of both the doctor of nursing practice (DNP) program and the 15-month (four consecutive semesters) accelerated second-degree bachelor of nursing science (ABSN) program located in Ashburn, VA. The first classes for these degrees were admitted in 2007 and 2009, respectively. In 2010, the GWU School of Nursing was re-established and is now the university's tenth academic institution, with Drs. Jean Johnson and Ellen Dawson as the founding deans.

Law School
The George Washington University Law School was established in 1826 and is the oldest law school in the District of Columbia. Supreme Court Justices Clarence Thomas, William Strong, David J. Brewer, Willis Van Devanter and John Marshall Harlan were among those who served on its faculty. Chief Justice John Roberts, Justice Sonia Sotomayor, Justice Samuel Alito, and Justice Antonin Scalia presided over its moot court in 2006, 2007 and 2009, respectively. The law school is located primarily on the east side of University Yard.

Graduate School of Education and Human Development
The Graduate School of Education & Human Development (GSEHD) officially started in 1909. The school is composed of five distinct academic departments, and it is one of the largest schools within GW.

College of Professional Studies
The George Washington University College of Professional Studies (CPS) was founded during the Trachtenberg Presidency. The Graduate School of Political Management is included within the college. CPS offers courses on the Foggy Bottom and Virginia campuses.

Graduate School of Political Management

The Graduate School of Political Management (GSPM) is an academic unit of the College of Professional Studies. GSPM offers graduate degrees in legislative affairs, political management, and other related disciplines. The current director is Lara Brown.

Milken Institute School of Public Health
Established in July 1997, and renamed in March 2014, the Milken Institute School of Public Health brought together three longstanding university programs in the schools of medicine, business, and education that have since expanded substantially. Today, more than 900 students from nearly every U.S. state and more than 35 nations pursue undergraduate, graduate, and doctoral-level degrees in public health. Its student body is one of the most ethnically diverse among the nation's private schools of public health.

The School also offers an array of joint degree programs, allowing students to couple a Juris Doctor (JD) with the Master of Public Health (MPH), or to combine an MPH with a Doctor of Medicine (MD) or an MA in International Affairs. An MPH/Physician Assistant program, the first in the world, is available at the Milken Institute SPH, as is the opportunity to serve as a Peace Corps volunteer while pursuing an MPH.

Academics

Admission 
GWU is the largest higher education institution in Washington, D.C. There are approximately 10,000 full-time undergraduates studying at George Washington University, and 14,000 graduate students. These students come from all 50 states and over 120 countries. Nearly 900 students participate in GW's Study Abroad Programs each semester in 50 countries. , George Washington University no longer required the SAT and ACT test scores for applicants in order to boost the enrollment of disadvantaged students.

GWU tuition was guaranteed to remain at the freshman rate for up to ten continuous (full-time) semesters of undergraduate attendance at the university. GWU no longer offers fixed tuition. The 2021–2022 academic year tuition rate was $59,780. Students were awarded $308.1 million in financial-aid during the 2017–2018 academic year. For the FY2011 cohort of students, the student loan default rate was 1.4, one of the lowest in the nation. For the 2010–2011 school year, the freshman retention rate was 94.3%. GWU requires that students live on campus for their first three years of enrollment as undergraduates. According to self-provided data by George Washington University, as of the 2011–2012 academic year, the acceptance rate for the Medical School was 3%, receiving 10,588 applications. GWU Law School's acceptance was 23%, receiving 10,021 applications. GW's Undergraduate studies' acceptance rate was 32%, receiving 21,433 applications. Admission to George Washington is considered to be competitive and highly selective, with The Princeton Review rating admissions difficulty as a 93 out of 99.

In September 2013, The GW Hatchet reported that the university had a need-aware admissions policy, even though it claimed to have a need-blind policy at the time. The university subsequently admitted that its admissions policy was, in fact, need-aware.

Enrollment
During the 2013–2014 academic year, there were 5,015 undergraduates enrolled in the Columbian College of Arts and Sciences, 2,005 in the Elliott School of International Affairs, 1,566 in the School of Business, 774 in the School of Engineering and Applied Science, 367 in the George Washington University School of Medicine and Health Sciences, 174 in the Milken Institute School of Public Health, and 153 in the School of Nursing.

Students come from all 50 U.S. states. The top states include New York, California, New Jersey, Pennsylvania, Massachusetts, Florida, Illinois and Connecticut.

George Washington University has many international students at both the undergraduate and graduate levels. During the 2013–2014 academic year, there were over 130 countries represented among the student body. The most represented countries represented were China, South Korea, India, Saudi Arabia, Canada, Mexico, United Kingdom, Turkey, France, Nigeria, Pakistan, Japan, Iran, Germany, Brazil, Colombia, and Vietnam.

Rankings
GWU was ranked tied for 25th of the "Top Universities for Producing Billionaires 2016–2017" by Times Higher Educations World University Rankings, which also ranks GWU as 51st of the "Top 100 Universities for Producing Millionaires" in the world.

Apart from its 61st national ranking, Forbes ranks GWU 44th among "Research Universities", 60th among "Private Colleges", 43rd among universities in the U.S. Northeast, and 287th among university rankings of "America's Best Value Colleges".

GWU was ranked the 66th world's wealthiest university in 2015.

The Princeton Review consistently ranks George Washington University in the Top 10 for the following categories:

Misreported admissions data
In 2012, the university received national attention when GWU officials announced that they had misreported admissions data on their student body for over a decade, overstating the number of students who had graduated from high school in the top ten percent of their classes due to a "data reporting error".  Consequently, U.S. News & World Report removed the school from its rankings and altered the GW's entry to being unranked for the 2013. The university was reinstated a year later in the 2014 rankings.

Program rankings
The Princeton Review ranked GWU first for "Top Colleges or Universities for Internship Opportunities." GWU is consistently ranked by The Princeton Review in the top "Most Politically Active" Schools.

U.S. News & World Report ranks GWU's international business program as eighth best in the world, its MBA program as 51st best, and its undergraduate business program as 38th best. The Financial Times ranks GWSB as the 47th best business school in the United States.

Foreign Policy ranks the Elliott School's Masters in International Affairs as the seventh best in the world in its 2018 "Inside the Ivory Tower" annual report. Foreign Policy ranks the Elliott School as being the eighth in the "Top U.S. Undergraduate Institutions to Study International Relations 2018."

U.S. News & World Report  ranks the Trachtenberg School of Public Policy and Public Administration as the 10th best public affairs school in the United States and as having the 6th best Global Policy program, 11th best public management program, the 14th best health policy program, and the 20th best social policy program in the U.S.

The 2020 U.S. News & World Report ranks GWU Law School as fifth best in the U.S. for its international law program, fifth best for intellectual law, second best for part-time law, and as the 22nd best law school in the United States. The National Law Journal ranked GWU Law 21st for law schools that sent the highest percentage of new graduates to NLJ 250 law firms, the largest and most prominent law practices in the U.S.

George Washington is ranked 61st for the "Best Global Universities for Social Sciences and Public Health 2018" by U.S. News & World Report.

The Times Higher Education ranks GWU as having the 64th best law program in the world in 2019.

Research

George Washington University is the largest research university in Washington, D.C. According to the National Science Foundation, GWU spent $260 million on research and development in 2018, ranking it 89th in the nation.

Centers and institutes

George Washington University has many research centers including (non-exhaustive):

Centers

Institutes

Student life
 

The university is located in downtown Washington, D.C., near the Kennedy Center, embassies, and other cultural events. Students are known as highly politically active; Uni in the USA stated that "politics at George Washington is about as progressive as it gets".

GWU has a Division I athletics program that includes men's baseball, basketball, cross country, golf, gymnastics, women's lacrosse, women's rowing, soccer, women's softball, swimming, women's tennis, women's volleyball and men's water polo. Colonials athletics teams compete in the Atlantic 10 Conference. The Division II men's and women's Rugby Teams both compete in the Potomac Rugby Union.

Student organizations

Most student organizations are run through the George Washington University Student Association (SA). The SA is fashioned after the federal government with an executive, legislative, and judicial branch. There are over 500 registered student organizations on campus. The largest student organization on campus, the GWU College Democrats have hosted speakers such as CNN contributor Donna Brazile and former DNC Chairman Howard Dean among many others. Likewise, the GWU College Republicans, the largest CR chapter in the nation, have been visited by politicians like John Ashcroft former Florida Governor Jeb Bush and former President George W. Bush. The International Affairs Society (IAS) runs the university's internationally top-ranked Model United Nations team, in addition to hosting yearly high school and middle school Model UN conferences on campus. This organization also hosts various foreign dignitaries, US Government officials, and subject matter experts to further inform and foster international understanding both in the university's student body and the greater D.C. community.

There are also several a cappella performance groups on campus. The university's school-sponsored a cappella group, the co-ed GWU Troubadours, has been a presence on campus since the mid-1950s and regularly records studio albums and travels internationally with the Department of Music. The Sons of Pitch, GW's only male a cappella group, has been around since 2003, and the female group the GWU Pitches was founded in 1996. All the groups are extremely committed to charity work, with the Troubadours holding an annual philanthropic concert in the fall entitled "Acappellapalooza," and the Sons of Pitch holding one in the spring named "The United States of A-Cappella." In the case of the former, groups from GWU are drawn for a concert, in the latter, groups from around the nation. The groups have raised tens of thousands of dollars for various charitable causes. Additionally, the university is home to the Voice gospel choir, a group that sings gospel music, the GWU Vibes, a co-ed group focusing on soulful music. The GWU Sirens, another all-girls group, and the GWU Motherfunkers, a coed top 40 group, were created in 2003 and 2012, respectively. Each year, the groups duke it out at the Battle of the A-Cappella groups, one of the biggest student events on GW's campus.
Another student group, the Emergency Medical Response Group (EMeRG) provides an all-volunteer 24/7 ambulance service for the campus and the Foggy Bottom/West End community at no cost. EMeRG has been active on campus since 1994 and has advanced from bike response into a two ambulance system that is sanctioned by the District of Columbia Department of Health and DC Fire and EMS (DCFEMS). EMeRG also plays an active role in special events in around the DC area including the Marine Corps Marathon, National Marathon, Cherry Blossom Race, Commencement, Inauguration and other events in downtown D.C. and on the National Mall.

Greek life 
GWU has a large Greek community with over 3,000 students consisting of just under 27 percent of the undergraduate population. Greek organizations are divided up between and governed by the Inter-Fraternity Council with 14 chapters, the Panhellenic Association with 11 chapters, and the Multicultural Greek Council with 13 chapters. Other Greek-life, known as "Alternative Greek Life" or simply "Alt-Greek", exists on campus in the form of professional, community-serviced based and honor groups although not under the university's traditional Greek life governing structure but instead are considered separate student organizations

Scholarly societies
There are chapters of many varied academic groups at the university. The local chapter of the Society of Physics Students was at one time under the auspices of world-renowned scientists like George Gamow, Ralph Asher Alpher, Mario Schoenberg and Edward Teller, who have all taught at the university. The Enosinian Society, founded in 1822, is one of the university's oldest student organizations. Invited speakers included Daniel Webster.

Campus media
There are four major news sources on campus: the independent student-run newspaper The GWU Hatchet, which publishes articles online daily and a print edition weekly; The Rival GW, an online-only student-run publication; the online-only radio station, WRGW; and the university's official news source, GWU Today. GWU also publishes a peer-reviewed journal, The International Affairs Review, which is run by graduate students at the Elliott School.

Environmental sustainability
George Washington University was ranked number 12 on The Sierra Club's magazine "Cool Schools List" for 2014 and was included in the Princeton Review's Guide to 322 Green Schools for 2013. The campus has a campus-wide building energy efficiency program along with nine LEED-certified buildings including the Milken Institute School of Public Health building. In 2016, university officials rejected demands by the student body for the university to divest from fossil fuels.

Athletics

George Washington University is a member of the Atlantic 10 Conference and most of its teams play at the NCAA Division I level. All indoor sports play at the Smith Center on the Foggy Bottom campus. The outdoor events are held at the Mount Vernon campus Athletic Complex. The university's colors are buff and blue (buff being a color similar to tan, but sometimes represented as gold or yellow). The colors were taken from George Washington's uniform in the Revolutionary War. The teams have achieved great successes in recent years including a first-round victory in the Men's NCAA Division I Soccer Tournament in 2004. The men's and women's varsity crew team rows out of Thompson's Boat Center on the Potomac River and competes in the Eastern Association of Rowing Colleges. In the 2008–09 season, the men's crew team placed an all-time high national ranking of 12th in the country. The sailing team competes in the Middle Atlantic Intercollegiate Sailing Association while the gymnastics team competes in the East Atlantic Gymnastics League. In 2007 the GWU Men's Water Polo team placed third at Eastern Championships and was ranked 14th in the nation. Officials announced that seven teams, such as "men's rowing, sailing, men’s and women’s squash, men’s indoor track, men’s tennis and women’s water polo will be eliminated" after the 2020–2021 school year, due to financial concerns resulting from the COVID-19 pandemic. These programs have the opportunity to become club sports following their elimination.

Basketball

Mike Jarvis coached GWU in the 1990s, and led the team to the NCAA Sweet 16 in 1993, where they were beaten by the Fab Five University of Michigan team (which later vacated its wins due to NCAA rule violations). Jarvis also coached former Colonials head coach Karl Hobbs in high school. Former NBA player Yinka Dare also played at George Washington for two years before being drafted in the first round by the New Jersey Nets.

Under former head coach Karl Hobbs, GW's basketball team returned to the national stage in 2004 after defeating No. 9 Michigan State and No. 12 Maryland in back to back games to win the 2004 BB&T Classic. That year, the men's basketball team went on to win the Atlantic 10 West Title and the Atlantic 10 Tournament Title, earning an automatic bid to the 2005 NCAA tournament. The team received a No. 12 seed, losing to No. 5 seed Georgia Tech in the first round.The team began the 2005–06 season ranked 21st in the Associated Press poll, reaching as high as sixth in the polls, and after some tournament success they closed out the year ranked 19th in the nation. They had a record of 26–2 going into the 2006 NCAA tournament. The 2005–06 team achieved the school's highest ranking in the last 50 years, peaking at No. 6 in the nation, had been one of the team's best and received an #8 seed in the NCAA Tournament. In the tournament, they came back from an 18-point second-half deficit to defeat #9 seed UNC-Wilmington, but lost to Duke University, the top overall seed, in the second round.

While only one Colonial from the 2005–06 team was drafted in the 2006 NBA Draft, J. R. Pinnock, two other Colonials from that team have played in the NBA. Pops Mensah-Bonsu played for the Dallas Mavericks, Houston Rockets, San Antonio Spurs and Toronto Raptors and Mike Hall played for the Washington Wizards.

The 2006–07 basketball season was considered by many to be a rebuilding year for the Colonials after graduating their entire starting front court and losing Pinnock to the NBA. Coach Karl Hobbs and Senior guard Carl Elliott managed to lead the team to a 23–8 record, winning the 2007 Atlantic 10 tournament in Atlantic City, New Jersey, once again earning an auto-bid to the NCAA Men's Division I Basketball Championship. The Colonials were placed as a #11 seed lost to No. 6 seed Vanderbilt University in Sacramento, CA, 77–44.Hobbs, a former player and coach under Jim Calhoun at the University of Connecticut coached the Colonials for 10 years. Known for his animated sideline personality Hobbs had been considered one of the up-and-coming coaches in the NCAA. On April 25, 2011, the university released Hobbs from his contractual obligations, forcing him to resign as men's basketball coach
In May 2011, Incoming Athletic Director Patrick Nero hired former University of Vermont head coach Mike Lonergan to take over the men's basketball program. The Bowie, Md. native had a slow start to his GWU tenure, finishing 10–21 in his first full year as coach, and improving to 13–17 in the second. The 2013–14 season solidified his hiring, as the team finished 24–9 on the year, tallying the second-most wins in a season in GWU history; took third place in the Atlantic 10 standings and made it to the Atlantic 10 Championship semifinals; and earned the program's 11th bid to the NCAA Tournament, their first in seven years.

The NCAA committee selected the Colonials as the #9 seed in the East Region for the tournament. They faced #8 seed Memphis in the second round. The Tigers took a five-point lead over the Colonials into the half, but the Colonials almost came back to win. A late rally cut the Memphis lead to only one point with 25 seconds to go, but the Colonials could not hold on and lost, 71–66.

Soon after the end of the Colonials' successful 2013–14 campaign, Lonergan signed a contract extension, keeping him with the program through the 2020–21 season.

The Colonials won the 2016 National Invitation Tournament, defeating Hofstra, Monmouth, Florida, San Diego State and Valparaiso for the first postseason national title in their history. Prior to the 2016–2017 season, Mike Lonergan was removed as head coach following allegations of verbal abuse from players and staff. He was replaced by assistant coach Maurice Joseph who served as interim head coach before being signed fully following the 2016–2017 basketball season.One of Lonergan's players, Yuta Watanabe, was the first Japanese-born student athlete to secure an NCAA Division I basketball scholarship. Watanabe now plays in the NBA, and is the second Japanese player ever in the NBA.

In March 2019, GWU hired Jamion Christian to be its next head men's basketball coach. After three years at GW, Christian was fired and Chris Caputo was hired from the University of Miami.

Baseball
The GWU baseball team, founded in 1891, is a member of the Atlantic 10 Conference, which is part of the National Collegiate Athletic Association's Division I. The team plays its home games at Barcroft Park in Arlington County, Virginia, and Gregg Ritchie is the team's coach.

Football

GWU had a college football team from 1881 to 1966. The team played home games primarily at Griffith Stadium and later at RFK Stadium. In 1966, the football program was discontinued due to a lack of adequate facilities and the university's desire to develop an on-campus fieldhouse for basketball and other sports. GWU has one alumni in the Pro Football Hall of Fame, Alphonse Leemans.

Spirit programs
The GWU Spirit Program includes a co-ed Cheer Team, the First Ladies Dance team, and the university mascot. The Colonials mascot is named George, and is portrayed by a student wearing an outfit inspired by a uniform worn by General Washington. In 2012, George took first place at the National Cheerleaders Association Mascot Competition and is the university's first national champion. The spirit program also includes the Colonial Brass, directed by Professor Benno Fritz.

The official fight song is "Hail to the Buff and Blue", composed in 1924 by GWU student Eugene F. Sweeney and rewritten in 1989 by Patrick M. Jones. The song is tolled twice-daily by bells atop Corcoran Hall, at 12:15pm and 6:00pm.

Club sports
The university also has various club sports, which are not varsity sports, but compete against other colleges. Examples include: boxing, basketball, volleyball, ice hockey, figure skating, fencing, lacrosse, rugby, soccer, triathlon, tennis, ultimate frisbee, cricket, water polo, equestrian and others.

Notable people

Notable alumni

George Washington University alumni have included many current and past political figures, both in the United States and abroad. 16 GWU alumni have served as foreign heads of state or government (4 currently serving as of 2019). Many alumni have held U.S. Cabinet positions, including former Attorney General William Barr, former acting Secretary of Defense Mark Esper, and former Secretary of the Interior David Bernhardt. GWU is one of the schools with the most alumni that have served in the U.S. Congress. Notable recent GWU alumni members of congress include Harry Reid (Senate Majority Leader for most of the Obama Presidency), Elizabeth Warren (2020 presidential candidate), Eric Cantor (House Majority Leader, 2011–2014), and Robert Byrd (President pro tempore of the Senate under President Bush and President Obama). Alumni have served as governors of 19 U.S. states, as well as the District of Columbia and Guam, among others. Some alumni serving in President Trump's White House include current White House Director of Strategic Communications Mercedes Schlapp and White House Cabinet Secretary Bill McGinley. Other prominent U.S. politicians include Senator J. William Fulbright, former Secretary of State Colin Powell, former FBI Director J. Edgar Hoover, former CIA Director Allen Dulles and his brother, former Secretary of State John Foster Dulles. Also, current Premier of Bermuda Edward David Burt (youngest in history) and current Chief Justice of the Supreme Court of Bhutan Tshering Wangchuk are GWU alumni. Former associate director for National Preparedness at the United States Federal Emergency Management Agency (FEMA), John Brinkerhoff was a GWU alumni.

In business, Lee Kun-hee (MBA), Chairman of Samsung who is credited with transforming the company into one of the largest electronics manufacturers, Scott Kirby (MS), CEO of United Airlines, Kathy J. Warden (MBA), President and CEO of Northrop Grumman and John F.W. Rogers (BA), Executive Vice President, Chief of Staff and Secretary to the Board of Goldman Sachs. Notable company founders include Robert A. Altman (JD), co-founder of ZeniMax Media, Elaine Wynn, co-founder of Wynn Resorts, and Tom Cortese, co-founder of Peloton.   

Science and technology alumni include Julius Axelrod (PhD), Nobel Laureate and medical researcher, Ralph Asher Alpher, National Medal of Science laureate, physicist and "father" of the Big Bang theory, Jack Edmonds, noted computer scientist and mathematician and one of the creators of combinatorial optimization, Walter O. Snelling, who first identified propane and researched how propane could be liquefied and used as a viable energy resource, Charles Browne Fleet, inventor of ChapStick. In addition, 7 NASA astronauts are alumni, including Charles Camarda and Serena Auñón-Chancellor.

In arts, entertainment and media, writer and filmmaker William Peter Blatty (MA), author of The Exorcist, which he adapted for the screen and won the Academy Award for Best Adapted Screenplay. Emmy winning actors Alec Baldwin and Kerry Washington are also alumni, while filmmaker and Palme d'Or recipient David Lynch, Oscar winning actor Jared Leto and portrait painter Ned Bittinger attended the Corcoran School of the Arts and Design. Journalism alumni include Pulitzer Prize winner Glenn Greenwald, CNN commentators Dana Bash and Chuck Todd as well as NBC News reporter Kasie Hunt.  

Leaders of academic institutions include William Greenleaf Eliot co-founder of Washington University in St. Louis, Derek Bok (AM), president of Harvard University, Scott Cowen (MBA), president of Tulane University and John T. Wilson, president of University of Chicago. 

Well known athletes and sports personnel include Boston Celtics coach Red Auerbach (BA, MA), winner of nine NBA championships as a head coach with an additional seven as a general manager for grand total of 16 NBA championships. Many players have been drafted into NBA such as Yinka Dare and Yuta Watanabe. Other notable athletes include WNBA star Jonquel Jones, NFL Hall of Fame running back Tuffy Leemans, and Olympic medalist Elena Myers. Several alumni have owned sports teams including Ted Lerner, owner of the Washington Nationals, Abe Pollin, owner of the Washington Wizards and Washington Capitals, Jerry Reinsdorf, owner of the Chicago Bulls and the Chicago White Sox.

Notable faculty and trustees

Notable GWU faculty include Tom Perez, former Chair of the Democratic National Committee; two current Supreme Court Justices, Clarence Thomas and Ketanji Brown Jackson; George Gamow, developer of the Big Bang theory; Edward Teller, "father of the hydrogen bomb"; Vincent du Vigneaud, Nobel Prize in Chemistry winner; John Negroponte, first Director of National Intelligence; Thomas Buergenthal, former President of the Inter-American Court of Human Rights; Masatoshi Koshiba, Nobel Prize in Physics winner; Scott Pace, current Executive Secretary of the National Space Council; Amitai Etzioni, former President of the American Sociological Association; Marshall Warren Nirenberg, Nobel Prize in Medicine winner; Edward P. Jones, Pulitzer Prize winner; Abba Eban, former Vice President of the United Nations General Assembly; Dana Perino, former White House Press Secretary; and Ferid Murad, Nobel Prize in Medicine winner.

Other faculty have included Frank Sesno, CNN former Washington, D.C. Bureau Chief and Special Correspondent; James Carafano, Heritage Foundation national security and homeland security expert; Leon Fuerth, former national security adviser to Vice President Al Gore; James Rosenau, political theorist and former president of the International Studies Association; Steven V. Roberts, American journalist, writer and political commentator and former senior writer at U.S. News & World Report; Nancy E. Gary, former dean of Albany Medical College, Executive Vice President of the Uniformed Services University of the Health Sciences and Dean of its F. Edward Hébert School of Medicine, Roy Richard Grinker, anthropologist specializing in autism and North-South Korean relations, Edward P. Jones, who won the Pulitzer Prize for fiction in 2004, novelist Herman "H.G." Carrillo, historian Jessica Krug, Dagmar R. Henney, Mohammad Nahavandian (economics), chief of staff of the President of Iran since 2013, and Faure Essozimna Gnassingbé (MBA), president of Togo since 2005, Dr. Blake R. Van Leer, president of Georgia Tech, Colonel and Civil Rights advocate.

See also

 Campuses of George Washington University
 GW-TV
 Hail to the Buff and Blue
 List of centers and research institutes at George Washington University
 National Security Archive
 The GW Hatchet
 United States v. Students Challenging Regulatory Agency Procedures
 WRGW

References

External links

 
 GWU Athletics website

 
1821 establishments in Washington, D.C.
Educational institutions established in 1821
Foggy Bottom
Private universities and colleges in Washington, D.C.